The 2022–23 South Carolina Gamecocks women's basketball team represents the University of South Carolina during the 2022–23 NCAA Division I women's basketball season. The Gamecocks, led by fifteenth-year head coach Dawn Staley, play their home games at Colonial Life Arena and compete as members of the Southeastern Conference (SEC).

Previous season

The Gamecocks finished the season with a 35–2 overall record and a 15–1 record in conference play. The Gamecocks lost the SEC Tournament. They therefore received an at-large bid to the 2022 NCAA Division I Women's Basketball Tournament, where they reached the national championship, defeating UConn 64–59.

Offseason

2022 recruiting class
The Gamecocks signed the #6 class for 2022 according to ESPN.

Chloe Kitts reclassified to the class of 2022.

Incoming transfers

Preseason
Hall of Fame coach Dawn Staley enters her fifteenth year at South Carolina, fresh off winning her 2nd national championship in the 2022 Women's Final Four winning all six games as head coach of South Carolina.

Award watch lists

Preseason All-American teams

SEC coaches poll
The SEC coaches poll was released on October 18, 2022.

Preseason All-SEC teams
The preseason all-SEC women's basketball team was announced on November 3, 2022.

First team

Aliyah Boston – F

Second team

Zia Cooke – G

Victaria Saxton – F

Player of the Year

Aliyah Boston – F

Preseason Defensive Player of the Year

Aliyah Boston – F

Roster

Starting lineup

Schedule

|-
!colspan=9 style=| Exhibition

|-
!colspan=12 style=|Regular season

|-
!colspan=9 style=| SEC Tournament

|-
!colspan=9 style=| NCAA Tournament

Statistics

Team total per game

Team average per game

Individual total per game

Individual average per game

Rankings

See also
2022–23 South Carolina Gamecocks men's basketball team

References

South Carolina Gamecocks women's basketball seasons
South Carolina
South Carolina Gamecocks w
South Carolina Gamecocks w
South Carolina